Watts Hospital, located in Durham, North Carolina was the city's first hospital, operating between 1895 and 1976.

The hospital opened in 1895, funded entirely by George W. Watts, as a private, 22-bed, modern hospital dedicated to the care of Durham's white citizens and offered free care to those unable to pay. The hospital became public in 1953 and closed 1976, when Durham County General Hospital opened. The grounds and buildings of the hospital's 1909 campus were converted to become the North Carolina School of Science and Mathematics, which began classes in 1980.

History
Watts was established in 1895, on land donated by George Watts with an endowment of $50,000, provided solely by Watts. The land fronted on West Main Street with Guess Road (later renamed Buchanan Blvd.) to the west and Watts Street to the east. Watts donated another $500,000 for the new hospital site, designed by Boston architect Bertrand E. Taylor in the Spanish Mission style. The hospital was enlarged in 1926 with the Valinda Beale Watts Pavilion, designed by the local architectural firm of Atwood and Nash. It was listed on the National Register of Historic Places in 1980.

In 1950, Brenda Joy (née Barksdale) Jones was born at Watts. Jones has gone on to fame as president of several prominent organizations in North Carolina, including Hemrocallis Club. She pushed legislation to make Watts a historic site or a school in the 1970s.

By the early 1960s, Watts had begun admitting black patients on a limited basis, constrained by its limited size. A 1966 referendum to fund a new, larger and integrated Watts Hospital was defeated by Durham voters, opposed by both whites and blacks, who feared that the new hospital would cater to whites, while blacks would be treated in the outmoded 1909 facility.

A second referendum, in 1968, which more clearly delineated that Watts and Lincoln hospitals would become extended care facilities when the new Durham County General Hospital opened its doors in 1976.  The referendum passed, though Watts was ultimately closed in favor of an enlarged Lincoln Community Health Center.

In September 1980, the first class of high school students moved into the deserted Watts Hospital buildings as the campus began a new life as the North Carolina School of Science and Mathematics (NCSSM), a boarding school for academically talented students from all over North Carolina. The old Spanish Mission style buildings were restored, while new, architecturally harmonious buildings were added. In one of the Durham's best examples of adaptive reuse, old Watts Hospital now thrives as NCSSM and serves to anchor the Watts-Hillandale Historic District which was designated a National Historic Neighborhood District in 1998.

Legacy

Duke University
By 1922, Watts Hospital's quality of care and its philanthropic mission to provide healthcare to the working poor was so well-regarded that James B. Duke and North Carolina Governor Cameron Morrison proposed the creation of the state's first four-year medical college, Duke University, to educate students in conjunction with clinical services provided at Watts Hospital.

Watts School of Nursing
In addition to founding the clinical hospital, George Watts also established the Watts Hospital Training School for Nurses at the hospital, in 1895.  Renamed the Watts School of Nursing (Watts SON) in 1976, the school's first graduate, Ethel Clay, received her nursing degree in 1897.

Now part of the Duke University Health System, Watts SON has been housed at Durham Regional Hospital since 1976.

Watts School of Nursing is now located on Croasdaile Drive in Durham, NC.

Notable alumnae
 Ethel Clay Price (1874-1943), nurse and socialite

References

External links
 Postcards from Watts Hospital Historical picture gallery of the 1909 campus, from 1908 to 1960.
 NCSSM 'Prehistory'

Hospital buildings completed in 1909
Hospitals in Durham, North Carolina
Hospital buildings on the National Register of Historic Places in North Carolina
Mission Revival architecture in North Carolina
History of North Carolina
Hospitals established in 1895
Defunct hospitals in North Carolina
National Register of Historic Places in Durham County, North Carolina
Historic district contributing properties in North Carolina
1895 establishments in North Carolina